Trevor Knight (born 1954) is an Irish musician, composer, theatre sound designer and director. Born in England, he moved to Northern Ireland as a child where he took an interest in the piano. He briefly attended college in Dublin, at Bolton Street College and it was here where he formed his first group, Naima.

Whilst living in the Netherlands, he founded the new wave group, Auto Da Fé, along with Gay Woods. When the group split up in 1986, Trevor moved into music composition and theatre sound design.

He was elected to Aosdána in 2007.

Discography

With Auto Da Fé 

5 Singles and 1 Smoked Cod (1984) Stoic (compilation of singles tracks)
Tatitum (1985) Spartan
Songs for Echo (2001) Hux (live 1983 recordings)

With others 

 Hold Me Now - Johnny Logan - "Heartbroken Man"
 Under the Influence - Mary Coughlan - piano, synthesizer
 Live For Ireland

See also 

 Carrier Frequency - Irish band

References 

1954 births
Living people
Irish keyboardists
Irish musical theatre composers